Michaël Bella (born 9 April 1993), known by his stage name Eptic, is a Belgian DJ and producer. He is most known for his extended play Overlord, which peaked at 22 on Billboards Top Dance/Electronic Albums chart.

Eptic began his career as a DJ at age 19. He gained notoriety in the dubstep scene after the release of his extended play Like a Boss, released on Never Say Die Records in 2012. Since then, he has collaborated with artists such as Habstrakt, DJ Snake, Valentino Khan, Jauz, and Dillon Francis.

Discography

Albums

Extended plays

Singles

Other charted songs

References

External links

Living people
Belgian electronic musicians
Dubstep musicians
Spinnin' Records artists
Monstercat artists
1993 births
People from Waasmunster
Electronic dance music DJs